Herman Van Loo (born 14 January 1945) is a former Belgian cyclist. He competed in the individual pursuit event at the 1964 Summer Olympics.

References

External links
 

1945 births
Living people
Belgian male cyclists
Olympic cyclists of Belgium
Cyclists at the 1964 Summer Olympics
Cyclists from Antwerp